The 2017 Calder Cup playoffs of the American Hockey League began on April 20, 2017, with the playoff format that was introduced in 2016. The sixteen teams that qualified, eight from each conference, played best-of-five series in the division semifinals, with the playoffs continuing with best-of-seven series for the division finals, conference finals, and Calder Cup finals. The Grand Rapids Griffins won their second Calder Cup championship by defeating the Syracuse Crunch 4-games-to-2 in the finals, in a repeat of the 2013 finals.

Playoff seeds
After the 2016–17 AHL regular season, 16 teams qualified for the playoffs. The top four teams in each division ranked by points percentage (points earned divided by points available) qualify for the 2017 Calder Cup Playoffs.

At the end of the regular season, the following teams qualified (with points percentage):

Eastern Conference

Atlantic Division
 Wilkes-Barre/Scranton Penguins – 107 points (.704)
 Lehigh Valley Phantoms – 101 points (.664)
 Hershey Bears – 97 points (.638)
 Providence Bruins – 96 points (.632)

North Division
 Syracuse Crunch – 90 points (.592)
 Toronto Marlies – 89 points (.586)
 Albany Devils – 83 points (.546)
 St. John's IceCaps – 82 points (.539)

Western Conference

Central Division
 Chicago Wolves – 101 points (.664)
 Grand Rapids Griffins – 100 points (.658)
 Milwaukee Admirals – 93 points (.612)
 Charlotte Checkers – 86 points (.566), 36

Pacific Division
 San Jose Barracuda – 95 points (.699)
 San Diego Gulls – 89 points (.664)
 Ontario Reign – 83 points (.619)
 Stockton Heat – 76 points (.567)

Bracket

Division semifinals 
Note 1: All times are in Eastern Time (UTC−04:00).
Note 2: Game times in italics signify games to be played only if necessary.
Note 3: Home team is listed first.

Eastern Conference

(A1) Wilkes-Barre/Scranton Penguins vs. (A4) Providence Bruins

(A2) Lehigh Valley Phantoms vs. (A3) Hershey Bears

(N1) Syracuse Crunch vs. (N4) St. John's IceCaps

(N2) Toronto Marlies vs. (N3) Albany Devils

Western Conference

(C1) Chicago Wolves vs. (C4) Charlotte Checkers

(C2) Grand Rapids Griffins vs. (C3) Milwaukee Admirals

(P1) San Jose Barracuda vs. (P4) Stockton Heat

(P2) San Diego Gulls vs. (P3) Ontario Reign

Division finals

Eastern Conference

(A3) Hershey Bears vs. (A4) Providence Bruins

(N1) Syracuse Crunch vs. (N2) Toronto Marlies

Western Conference

(C1) Chicago Wolves vs. (C2) Grand Rapids Griffins

(P1) San Jose Barracuda vs. (P2) San Diego Gulls

Conference finals

Eastern Conference

(A4) Providence Bruins vs. (N1) Syracuse Crunch

Western Conference

(P1) San Jose Barracuda vs. (C2) Grand Rapids Griffins

Calder Cup Finals

Syracuse Crunch vs. Grand Rapids Griffins

Playoff statistical leaders

Leading skaters

These are the top ten skaters based on points. If there is a tie in points, goals take precedence over assists.

GP = Games played; G = Goals; A = Assists; Pts = Points; +/– = Plus-minus; PIM = Penalty minutes

{| class="wikitable sortable" style="text-align:center"
|-
! style="width:12em" | Player
! style="width:15em" | Team
! style="width:4em"  | GP
! style="width:4em"  | G
! style="width:4em"  | A
! style="width:4em"  | PTS
! style="width:4em"  | PIM
|-
| align=left |  || align=left|Grand Rapids Griffins
| 22 || 31|| 36 || 67  || 27
|-
| align=left |  || align=left|Syracuse Crunch
| 22 || 9 || 18 || 27 || 29
|-
| align=left |  || align=left|Grand Rapids Griffins
| 19 || 10 || 12 || 22 || 18
|-
| align=left |  || align=left|Grand Rapids Griffins
| 19 || 8 || 13 || 21 || 2
|-
| align=left |  || align=left|Syracuse Crunch
| 22 || 5 || 15 || 20 || 11
|-
| align=left |  || align=left|Grand Rapids Griffins
| 19 || 9 || 10 || 19 || 50
|-
| align=left |  || align=left|Grand Rapids Griffins
| 19 || 2 || 17 || 19 || 12
|-
| align=left |  || align=left|Providence Bruins
| 17 || 9 || 9 || 18 || 0
|-
| align=left |  || align=left|San Jose Barracuda
| 15 || 9 || 8 || 17 || 8
|-
| align=left |  || align=left|Grand Rapids Griffins
| 19 || 6 || 10 || 16 || 18
|}

 Leading goaltenders 

This is a combined table of the top five goaltenders based on goals against average and the top five goaltenders based on save percentage with at least 240 minutes played. The table is initially sorted by goals against average, with the criterion for inclusion in bold'.GP = Games played; W = Wins; L = Losses; SA = Shots against; GA = Goals against; GAA = Goals against average; SV% = Save percentage; SO = Shutouts; TOI = Time on ice (in minutes)''

References

External links
AHL official site

Calder Cup playoffs
Calder Cup Playoffs